For Me and My Gal can refer to:

For Me and My Gal (film), a 1942 Judy Garland-Gene Kelly musical directed by Busby Berkeley
"For Me and My Gal" (song), a 1917 popular standard song by George W. Meyer, Edgar Leslie, and E. Ray Goetz

See also
Me and My Gal, a 1932 romantic comedy/drama film directed by Raoul Walsh
Me and My Girl, a 1937 musical
Me and My Girl (TV series), a 1980s British sitcom